Bapini is a village in Jodhpur, Rajasthan, India. It is located near Osian.

Its location is latitude 27.1983641 and longitude 72.8500649.

References

Villages in Jodhpur district
 

Tehsil-bapini
A village where only live panchariya brahmans.